The Leica M6 is a rangefinder camera manufactured by Leica from 1984 to 2002 until its major reissue in 2022.

The M6 combines the silhouette of the Leica M3 and Leica M4 with a modern, off-the-shutter light meter with no moving parts and LED arrows in the viewfinder. Informally it is referred to as the M6 "Classic" to distinguish it from the "M6 TTL" models, and to indicate its "Classic" M3 dimensions. The top and bottom plates were made from lighter, cheaper magnesium alloy rather than the heavier machined brass of the M3 and M4. The M6 and M6 TTL are mechanical cameras; all functions save the light meter work without batteries, unlike the succeeding M7, which needs electrical power to operate properly.

Leica M6 variants
M6J – 1994. A collector's edition of 1,640 cameras to celebrate the 40th anniversary of the Leica M System. Notable for its introduction of the 0.85 magnification finder, the first high-magnification finder since 1966, and the basis for the 0.85 cameras to follow starting in 1998.
M6 0.85 – 1998. The 0.85 magnification viewfinder was offered on regular production cameras for easier and more accurate focusing with long focal length or wide aperture lenses, such as the 50 mm f/1.0 Noctilux and 75 mm f/1.4 Summilux. The 28 mm framelines are dropped in this model. Only 3,130 of these cameras were made (all black chrome), so they are among the less common regular production of the M6.
M6 TTL – 1998–2002. The M6 TTL replaced the M6, which ceased manufacture. Originally available in 0.72 and 0.85 viewfinder versions; in 2000 a 0.58 version of M6 TTL was added to the line. The lower magnification viewfinder makes it easier to see the 28mm framelines, especially when wearing glasses. The shutter dial of the M6 TTL is reversed from previous models, turning in the same direction as the light meter arrows in the viewfinder; this feature has continued in the M7, M8, and M9, but not the MP, which returned to the older, smaller diameter, opposite direction shutter speed dial. One of the key differences from the M6 "Classic" is TTL flash capability with dedicated flash units, such as the SF-20. The added electronics increased the height of the top plate by 2 mm.
M6 0.72 – 2022. Leica reissued the M6 with 0.72x viewfinder magnification in October 2022. The redesigned top cover is milled from a solid brass painted with an enhanced abrasion-resistant black lacquer.

Specifications
 Viewfinder: 0.58×, 0.72× and 0.85×
 Framelines: 0.58× (28-90, 35, 50–75), 0.72× (28-90, 35-135, 50–75), 0.85× (35-135, 50–75, 90)
 Shutter speeds: 1 sec., 1/2, 1/4, 1/8, 1/15, 1/30, [detent at 1/50 for flash synch], 1/60, 1/125, 1/250, 1/500, 1/1000, B [M6 TTL adds "off" position to shutter dial]
 Film speed: 6–6400 ISO
 Power supply [for exposure meter operation only]: 2 silver oxide button cells (type SR44) or 1 lithium battery (1/3 N)

Leica M6 special editions
The Leica M6 has more special editions than any other M cameras as of 2013. The following list includes some, but not all Leica M6 Special Editions:

Gallery

References

External links

 The Leica M-System page at Leica.
 Leica M6 Special Editions by Thorsten Overgaard.
 An article about the M6 at the Washington Post by Frank Van Riper.
 Article by M. Feuerbacher
 An article about the M6 at Photo.net

M6
Leica rangefinder cameras
Products introduced in 1984